The City of Boroondara is a local government area in Victoria, Australia. It is located in the eastern suburbs of Melbourne. It was formed in June 1994 from the amalgamation of the Cities of Kew, Camberwell and Hawthorn.

In June 2018 the City had a population of 181,289. 

City of Boroondara participates in the Victorian Government’s state-wide, Local Government Community Satisfaction Survey. This is conducted annually by an independent research company, JWS Research. In 2022 City of Boroondara achieved an index score of 71 on ‘Overall Performance’. This is significantly higher than the average ratings for metropolitan councils (index score of 65) and the state-wide average (index score of 59) and places Boroondara in the top-performing councils metro and state-wide.

History
This area was originally occupied by the Wurundjeri Indigenous Australians of the Kulin nation.

In 1837, John Gardiner (after whom Gardiners Creek was named) and his family were the first Europeans to settle in the area. Robert Hoddle surveyed the area in 1837 and declared it the "Parish of Boroondara". The area was densely wooded, so he took a word from the Woiwurrung language (as spoken by the Wurundjeri), meaning "where the ground is thickly shaded".

The first Local Government body was the Boroondara District Road Board, formed on 11 July 1854 and incorporating the areas which were to become the City of Hawthorn, City of Kew and City of Camberwell. Hawthorn and Kew were created as separate municipalities in 1860 and the remaining area of the Road Board became Shire of Boroondara on 17 November 1871, which later became the City of Camberwell.

The three municipalities were amalgamated in June 1994 to create the City of Boroondara. Existing councillors from the three municipalities were replaced initially by three commissioners - David Glanville (chair), David Thomas and Marion Macleod. The commissioners were in turn replaced by ten councillors following elections in 1996.

Local government
Boroondara City Council is the third tier of government and deals with services such as waste and recycling collection, leisure centres, building and planning permits and approvals, roads, drainage, health services, youth services, children's services, food safety, parks and gardens, library services, pets, street parking permits and the collection of rates and charges.

Current composition and election method

Boroondara City Council is composed of eleven councillors, each representing one of eleven wards. On Thursday 9 July 2020, the Minister for Local Government formally announced a change to Boroondara’s electoral structure. This change follows a review by the Victorian Electoral Commission (VEC), which was completed in June 2019. This change included an increase in ward and councillor numbers from 10 to 11. The new 11th ward is named Riversdale Ward, and is located to the south-west where it shares a boundary with Glenferrie, Junction and Gardiner Wards. This addition resulted in a number of boundary changes across the municipality.

In 2020, the COVID-19 pandemic threatened to disrupt the local elections, with some arguing that the inability to campaign in-person would benefit incumbents with name-recognition, or resource rich candidates who could invest in letter box campaigns with leaflets. A decision was made, on public health grounds, that it was safe to proceed with the elections and voters were only able to return their ballots via postal voting.

All councillors are elected for a fixed four-year term of office, with the most recent election being held in December 2022. Councillors-elect were sworn-in at a Special Meeting of Council on Thursday 8 December 2022. The current mayor is Cr Felicity Sinfield.

Past councillors 
Single member wards, 1996-2019

 Liberal
 Labor
1. Gina Goldsmith
2. Phil Meggs
3. Dennis Whelan
4. Mary Halikias-Byrnes

Boroondara mayors

 List of mayors of Boroondara

Townships and localities
The 2021 census, the city had a population of 167,900 up from 167,231 in the 2016 census

^ - Territory divided with another LGA

Infrastructure

The Council is responsible for the management of stormwater collection and removal. The water supply authority is Yarra Valley Water.

Libraries
The City of Boroondara has five libraries at Camberwell, Ashburton, Balwyn, Kew and Hawthorn, and in 2018 opened a 'library lounge' at the Greythorn Community Hub in Balwyn North.

Local area

Schools

Boroondara has one of the highest concentrations of students in Australia and contains many private schools, including Xavier College, Methodist Ladies' College (MLC), Strathcona Baptist Girls' Grammar School, Camberwell Grammar School, Trinity Grammar School, Ruyton Girls' School, Rossbourne School, Carey Baptist Grammar School, Scotch College, Fintona Girls' School, Genazzano FCJ College, Preshil, and Alia College. It contains Catholic schools such as St Michael's Parish School (Ashburton) Our Lady of Good Counsel (Deepdene) and St Bede's School (Balwyn North) and a number of public schools, including Canterbury Girls' Secondary College, Balwyn High School, Kew High School, Auburn High School and Camberwell High School.

See also
 List of Melbourne suburbs

References

External links
 

Official website
Link to Land Victoria interactive maps

Local government areas of Melbourne
Greater Melbourne (region)